The 2021–22 season was Vojvodina's 107th season in existence and the club's 16th competing in the Serbian SuperLiga.

Transfers

In

Out

Friendlies

Summer training camp

Winter training camp

Competitions

Overview

Serbian SuperLiga

Regular season

League table

Results by matchday

Results

Championship round league table

Championship round result round by round

Championship round matches

Serbian Cup

UEFA Europa Conference League

Statistics

Squad statistics 

|-
! colspan=14 style="background:red; color:white; text-align:center;"| Goalkeepers

|-
! colspan=14 style="background:red; color:white; text-align:center;"| Defenders

|-
! colspan=14 style="background:red; color:white; text-align:center;"| Midfielders

|-
! colspan=14 style="background:red; color:white; text-align:center;"| Forwards

|-
! colspan=14 style="background:red; color:white; text-align:center;"| Players transferred out during the season
|-

Goal scorers 

Last updated: 22 May 2022

Clean sheets 

Last updated: 22 May 2022

Disciplinary record 

Last updated: 22 May 2022

Game as captain 

Last updated: 22 May 2022

References 

FK Vojvodina seasons
Vojvodina